"Watch the Flowers Grow" is a song composed by L. Russell Brown and Raymond Bloodworth and popularized by The Four Seasons in 1967. The single was released in the wake of The Beach Boys' Pet Sounds and The Beatles' Sgt. Pepper's Lonely Hearts Club Band, "Watch the Flowers Grow" struggled up the Billboard Hot 100, peaking at #30, as The Four Seasons' music was rapidly falling out of favor with the American record-buying public (the Four Seasons' next single, a cover of The Shirelles' #1 hit "Will You Love Me Tomorrow" did slightly better, reaching #24 as the last Top 40 Four Seasons hit until "Who Loves You" in 1975).

Billboard described the single as a "timely, easy-beat ballad" that was one of the Four Seasons' "most unusual entries."  Cash Box said  that it's "gently pulsing, melodic, romp."

Songwriter L. Russell Brown would compose (or co-compose) a string of hit records in the 1970s, including several recorded by Dawn featuring Tony Orlando.

References

The Four Seasons (band) songs
1967 singles
Songs written by L. Russell Brown
Song recordings produced by Bob Crewe
1967 songs
Philips Records singles